The 2014 Canadian Senior Curling Championships were held from March 22 to 29 at the Yellowknife Community Arena and the Yellowknife Curling Centre in Yellowknife, Northwest Territories. The winners represented Canada at the 2015 World Senior Curling Championships.

Men

Round-robin standings
Final round-robin standings

Playoffs

Semifinal
Friday, March 28, 6:30 pm

Final
Saturday, March 29, 2:30 pm

Women

Round-robin standings
Final round-robin standings

Playoffs

Semifinal
Friday, March 28, 6:30 pm

Final
Saturday, March 29, 2:30 pm

References

External links

Canadian Seniors, 2014
Canadian Seniors, 2014
Canadian Seniors, 2014
Sport in Yellowknife
Canadian Senior Curling Championships
Canadian Senior Curling Championships